Johnny Jackson (9 February 1879 – 6 April 1939) was an Australian rules footballer who played with South Melbourne in the Victorian Football League (VFL).

Family
The son of William Jackson (1846-1900), and Emma Jackson (1848-1909), née Eccles, John Jackson was born in Carlton, Victoria on 9 February 1879.

Death
He died at Hampton, Victoria on 6 April 1939.

Notes

References

External links 
 
 
 "Jackson, _Port05" at The VFA Project.
 Jack Jackson at The VFA Project.

1879 births
1939 deaths
Australian rules footballers from Melbourne
Sydney Swans players
Port Melbourne Football Club players
People from Carlton, Victoria